John Thomas Allen (September 30, 1904 – March 29, 1959) was an American pitcher in Major League Baseball (MLB), who played for the New York Yankees, Cleveland Indians, St. Louis Browns, Brooklyn Dodgers, and New York Giants.

Early life
Born in Lenoir, North Carolina, Allen spent part of his youth in the Baptist orphanage in Thomasville, North Carolina, and he attended Thomasville High School.

Baseball career
Allen reached the Yankees in an unusual way. While working as a bellhop in a hotel, he was told to take some fans to the room of Yankee scout Paul Krichell. Allen told Krichell that he was a pitcher, and the scout arranged a tryout. He was less stellar in that year's World Series, starting Game 4 and leaving after giving up three runs off five hits in just  of an inning.

Allen continued to post decent records for the Yankees, but a sore arm and his constant demands for more money threatened his career. For these reasons, Allen was dealt to the Indians before the  season.

In , Allen won his first twelve decisions and made his only All-Star team. During the All-Star break, he suffered an unknown injury, some claim he slipped on a bar of soap in the shower, and never did approach his earlier success again, finally retiring in  after six mediocre campaigns. Allen's finished his 13-year career with a 142–75 record and one of the best winning percentages (.654) in MLB history.

After retiring as a player, Allen became a minor league umpire, eventually becoming the umpire-in-chief of the Carolina League. He was posthumously inducted into the North Carolina Sports Hall of Fame, in 1977.

Death
On March 29, 1959, Allen died in St. Petersburg, Florida; in retirement, he had been involved in the real estate business. Allen was 54 years old.

Career summary
As a hitter, Allen posted a .173 career batting average (124-for-716), with 82 runs, four home runs, 64 runs batted in (RBI), and 33 bases on balls. Defensively, he recorded a .957 lifetime fielding percentage.

Tributes from peers
Baseball Hall of Fame member Al Simmons named Allen the toughest pitcher for him to hit and Hall of Fame slugger Hank Greenberg named Allen among the five toughest pitchers he faced in his career.

References

External links

1904 births
1959 deaths
Major League Baseball pitchers
Baseball players from North Carolina
New York Yankees players
Cleveland Indians players
St. Louis Browns players
Brooklyn Dodgers players
New York Giants (NL) players
American League All-Stars
Raleigh Capitals players
Fayetteville Highlanders players
Greenville Tobacconists players
Asheville Tourists players
Gadsden Eagles players
Jersey City Skeeters players
Toronto Maple Leafs (International League) players
Greensboro Patriots players
People from Lenoir, North Carolina
Greenville Greenies players